means in Japanese "tea puppy" or "tea dog". They are colorful puppies, most of them with leaves for ears, representing "tea leaves". They were first introduced as toys released by Sega Toys. Later, due to the popularity, an animated series was made based on the Ocha-Ken.

Characters

Main series

Dogs
Ryoku
Ryoku is the green Ocha-Ken, who has two green leaves for ears. Most of the time, Ryoku is seen sleeping. His nose has a special tendency to notice green tea, which Ryoku loves to drink. Of course, his tea is green tea, 緑茶 (ryokucha).

Aru
Aru is the red Ocha-Ken, who has two red leaves for ears. He wears a cape, and is very adventurous. He is inspired by heroes on television, and wants to be a superhero, although most of his attempts do not turn out the way he wanted them to. His tea is black tea, 紅茶 (koucha).

Ron
Ron is the black Ocha-Ken, who has two gold leaves for ears. He is the most mysterious of the Ocha-Ken, who in one episode predicted rainfall, and had the ability to find Ryoku while no one else was able to. His tea is oolong (Wulong) tea, 烏龍茶 (u-roncha).

Hana
Hana is the pink Ocha-Ken, who has two purple leaves for ears. On her ears she has flowers, due to her love of flowers. She is the only female Ocha-Ken in the group. She loves flowers and is usually in a good mood. Her tea is herbal tea, ハーブ茶 (ha-bucha).

Chai
Chai is the pale cream-colored Ocha-Ken, who has two yellow leaves for ears. Chai is the troublemaker of the group, and is often doing silly things. Chai loves to eat pudding, as you can see in episode 3. Chai's tea is, of course, Indian Chai, チャイ (chai).

Cafe
Cafe is the dark brown Ocha-Ken, who has coffee beans for ears, unlike the other Ocha-Ken. In early episodes, Cafe was upset because of his difference, but later in the series got over it. His tea is actually not a tea at all, but coffee instead, コーヒー (ko-hi-)

Muha
Muha is the gold Ocha-Ken, who has multiple brown leaves for ears. Muha is very hyper, and has a lot of energy. He can be seen running around, while the other Ocha-Ken are resting. His tea is barley tea, 麦茶 (mugicha).

Cats
Sakura
Sakura is the pink Ocha-neko, a romantist. Likes being dramatic. Apparently has a crush on somebody. Her tea is cherry tea, 桜桃 [literally cherry tree-peach] (sakuranbou).

Ran
Ran is the blue Ocha-neko, a calm and quiet sort. She is very tolerant and has never been sighted angry. Likes being clean. Her tea is lavender tea, ラベンダー (rabenda-).

Min
Min is the yellow Ocha-neko, a polite and popular cat, surrounded by friends. Her tea is jasmine tea, ジャスミン (jasumin).

So
So is the aquamarine Ocha-neko with tan spots, a cleanly cat loving cleaning. She also takes lots care of keeping in health. Her tea is soba tea, 蕎麦 (soba).

Mini dogs
Ruu
The mini type of the black tea Ocha-Ken.

Midori
The mini type of the green tea Ocha-Ken.

Fan
The mini type of the oolong tea Ocha-Ken

Animated Series
The Ocha-Ken animated series was aimed at a younger audience. There are 26 episodes, approximately 3½ minutes long, and include a short story and a lesson.

Toys
The Ocha-Ken toys were the original idea of the tea puppies. They are tea-scented and in the first year of its release, 400,000 of the Ocha-Ken toys were sold. They were released by Sega Toys.

Video games

Game Boy Advance
Ochaken no Heya released December 19, 2003. Similar to Nintendogs, though this came out before.
Ocha-Ken Kururin: Honwaka Puzzle de Hottoshiyo- released October 28, 2004 by MTO. This is a puzzle game featuring the Ocha-Ken, and Ocha-Neko.
Ocha-Ken no Yumebouken released April 28, 2005 by MTO. In this action game, you control the Ocha-Ken, to go and gather balloons. You can collect parts to make your own Ocha-Ken.
Ochaken no Boukenjima released December 22, 2005.

Nintendo DS
Ocha-Ken no Heya DS released April 27, 2006 by MTO. This is a Nintendogs-like game, but instead you play with the Ocha-Ken. By playing mini-games, you can collect parts to make and design your own room. This game got localized to America and Europe under the titles Petz Dogz 2 in America, and Dogz 2 in Europe.
Ochaken no Heya DS2 released January 18, 2007. Another similar to the first.
Ochaken no Daibouken - Honwaku Yumemiru Sekai Ryoukou released December 20, 2007
Ochaken no Heya DS3 released May 22, 2008.
Ochaken no Heya DS4 was slated to come out in November 2009.

Nintendo 3DS
Ochaken to Itsumo Nakayoshi, a virtual pet game from Nippon Columbia, released December 1, 2011.

Arcade
Ocha-Ken no Puzzle released in December 2010 by IGS. This puzzle game is developed by Compile Heart.

References

External links
 Official Site (Japan) (Japanese)
 Official Site (Asia) (Japanese)
 Unofficial Site (English)

Animated characters
2000s toys
Fictional dogs
Video games about dogs